Zembra is a Tunisian island. The island is a  rock formation, and as such contains many 400 metre-high cliffs. Zembra is a natural fortress that housed a resort until 1976 and then passed into the hands of the Tunisian army. On the southern coast there are remains of an ancient harbour.

Zembra is most probably the same as the island called Aegimouros by many ancient writers. Pliny the Elder called both Zembra and Zembretta Aegimuri.

Environment
Zembra has a fragile ecosystem and has been classified as a protected area by UNESCO since 1977. With the nearby island of Zembretta, it is also classified as an Important Bird Area (TN003). The island has a Mediterranean climate. The native soils include rock, clay, sand and  magnesium lime.

Flora and fauna
Zembra is a local hotspot (nano-hotspot) for the vascular flora on the scale of Tunisia, and an Important Plant Area (IPA) for North Africa. The island's vegetation consists of about 266 plant species; the flora is characterised by a canopy of dense bush, including olive, Phoenician juniper and gorse, and the presence of rare plants which favour saline soils. 

There are also invertebrates and terrestrial mammals introduced by man, such as rabbit,  Corsican sheep, black rat and feral cat. Dolphins are also common in the waters surrounding the island. The Mediterranean monk seal Monachus monachus (CR) which used to visit the island, was last seen in 1975.

In addition, Zembra is located on an avian migration route between Tunisia and the Strait of Sicily, and hosts more than 25,000 pairs of migrating birds which nest in the rocky cliffs. The island is home to the largest colony of Scopoli's shearwaters in the Mediterranean (20,000 breeding pairs).  The 9 km of cliffs of the island also hold 10 breeding pairs of Peregrine falcons Falco peregrinus, one of the highest densities known for this species. Other breeding birds include the rare Audouin's gulls Larus audouinii (10 pairs), European shags Phalacrocorax aristotelis and Caspian gulls Larus cachinnans (100 pairs).

The island, along with the neighbouring islet of Zembretta, has been designated an Important Bird Area (IBA) by BirdLife International.

References

Islands of Tunisia
Uninhabited islands of Tunisia
Biosphere reserves of Tunisia
Important Bird Areas of Mediterranean islands
Important Bird Areas of Tunisia
Seabird colonies
National parks of Tunisia